Gerardo Bianco (12 September 1931 – 1 December 2022) was an Italian politician.

Early life
Bianco was born in Guardia Lombardi, Campania in Italy. Winner of a scholarship at the Augustinianum College of Catholic University of the Sacred Heart, he graduated in classical letters.

Career
Bianco has been Deputy from 1968 to 1994 and from 2001 to 2008, chairman of Christian Democracy (Democrazia Cristiana; DC) in the Chamber from 1979 to 1983 and from 1992 to 1994, Vice-President of Chamber of Deputies from 1987 to 1990 and MEP from 1994 to 1999. He also served as Minister of Education in the Andreotti VI Cabinet.

In 1995 he opposed the Secretary of the Italian People's Party (PPI), Rocco Buttiglione, for his approach to the centre-right during the regional elections that year. Bianco was subsequently elected Secretary of the PPI while Buttiglione founded a new party, the United Christian Democrats (CDU). He remained Secretary until 1997, the year he became president of PPI. He also was the director of the newspaper Il Popolo in 1995 and from 1999 to 2000.

In 2002 Bianco opposed the dissolution of the PPI into The Daisy (DL), and so joined the new party as an independent. In 2004 he founded the movement Popular Italy(IP), with the purpose of restoring an autonomous organized presence for democratic Catholics in Italy. In 2008 he refused to join the Democratic Party (PD) and instead entered the mixed (Misto) group.

Personal life and death
Bianco died in Rome on 1 December 2022, at the age of 91.

References

External links

1931 births
2022 deaths
Christian Democracy (Italy) politicians
Democracy is Freedom – The Daisy politicians
Italian People's Party (1994) politicians
Democratic Party (Italy) politicians
20th-century Italian politicians
21st-century Italian politicians
Deputies of Legislature V of Italy
Deputies of Legislature VI of Italy
Deputies of Legislature VII of Italy
Deputies of Legislature VIII of Italy
Deputies of Legislature IX of Italy
Deputies of Legislature X of Italy
Deputies of Legislature XI of Italy
Deputies of Legislature XIV of Italy
Deputies of Legislature XV of Italy
MEPs for Italy 1994–1999
University of Parma alumni
Academic staff of the University of Parma
Italian Roman Catholics
People from Guardia Lombardi